Michael Kearney (October 4, 1874 – October 21, 1937) was a private serving in the United States Marine Corps during the Spanish–American War who received the Medal of Honor for bravery.

Biography
Kearney was born on October 4, 1874, in Newmarket, Ireland. He joined the Marine Corps from Boston in April 1896, and retired with the rank of captain in December 1926.

Kearney died on October 21, 1937, and is buried at Holy Cross Cemetery in Brooklyn, New York.

Medal of Honor citation
Rank and organization: Private, U.S. Marine Corps. Born: 4 October 1874, Newmarket, Ireland. Accredited to: Massachusetts. G.O. No.: 521, 7 July 1899.

Citation:

On board the U.S.S. Nashville during the operation of cutting the cable leading from Cienfuegos, Cuba, 11 May 1898. Facing the heavy fire of the enemy, Kearney set an example of extraordinary bravery and coolness throughout this action.

See also

List of Medal of Honor recipients for the Spanish–American War

References

External links

1874 births
1937 deaths
19th-century Irish people
Irish-born Medal of Honor recipients
People from County Cork
United States Marine Corps Medal of Honor recipients
United States Marines
American military personnel of the Spanish–American War
Irish emigrants to the United States (before 1923)
Spanish–American War recipients of the Medal of Honor